Barral is a surname. Notable people with the surname include:

Carlos Barral (1928–1989), Spanish poet
David Barral (born 1983), Spanish  footballer
Émile Barral (1891 1961), Monegasque  sailor
Javi Barral (born 1981), Spanish  footballer
Joe Barral (born 1945), Monegasque sports shooter
Louis Barral (1910–1999), Monégasque lexicographer
Luigi Barral (1907–1962), Italian cyclist
Rolando Barral (1939–2002), Cuban actor, television presenter and radio host
Romulo Barral (born 1983), Brazilian Jiu Jitsu

See also
Baral (disambiguation)
Barral of Baux (died 1268), was Viscount of Marseilles and Lord of Baux
Éditions Xavier Barral, is a French book publisher
Luísa Margarida de Barros Portugal, Countess of Barral (1816–1891), was Brazilian noble and courtier